In number theory, a bi-twin chain of length k + 1 is a sequence of natural numbers

 

in which every number is prime.

The numbers  form a Cunningham chain of the first kind of length , while  forms a Cunningham chain of the second kind. Each of the pairs  is a pair of twin primes.

Largest known bi-twin chains 

q# denotes the primorial 2×3×5×7×...×q.

, the longest known bi-twin chain is of length 8.

Relation with other properties

Related chains 

 Cunningham chain

Related properties of primes/pairs of primes 

 Twin primes
 Sophie Germain prime is a prime  such that  is also prime.
 Safe prime is a prime  such that  is also prime.

Notes and references 

Prime numbers